SS Samoland was a Liberty ship built in the United States during World War II. She was transferred to the British Ministry of War Transportation (MoWT) upon completion.

Construction
Samoland was laid down on 10 April 1944, under a Maritime Commission (MARCOM) contract, MC hull 2359, by J.A. Jones Construction, Brunswick, Georgia; sponsored by Mrs. H.B. Jones, daughter-in-law of James Addison Jones, and launched on 20 May 1944.

History
She was allocated to E.R. Management Co., on 9 June 1944. On 30 April 1947, she was sold to the Dover Navigation Co., for commercial use. She was wrecked in 1955, and declared a constructive total loss (CTL), but rebuilt. She was again wrecked in 1968, and scrapped the same year.

References

Bibliography

 
 
 
 
 

 

Liberty ships
Ships built in Brunswick, Georgia
1944 ships
Liberty ships transferred to the British Ministry of War Transport